Avishai Cohen or Avishay Cohen may refer to:

Avishai Cohen (bassist) (born 1970), Israeli jazz bassist
Avishai Cohen (trumpeter) (born 1978), Israeli-born jazz trumpeter based in New York
Avishay Cohen (born 1995), Israeli footballer